The Republic of Ireland national football team played their first international association football match on 28 May 1924 as the Irish Free State, defeating Bulgaria 1–0 at the 1924 Summer Olympics. The Irish Free State side was established following the partition of the country in 1921. Prior to this a unified Irish team had represented the whole of Ireland in international football.

As of October 2021, nine Irish international players have scored a hat-trick (three goals) or more in a game. The first player to achieve the feat was Ned Brooks on 16 June 1924 against the United States. Two players have scored four goals during a match, Paddy Moore against Belgium in 1934, the only match which Ireland have failed to win when one of their players has scored a hat-trick, and Don Givens against Turkey in 1975. Other than Brooks, four players have scored a single hat-trick for Ireland, John Joe Flood in 1929, David Kelly on his international debut in 1987, David Connolly in 1997 and Callum Robinson in 2021. Don Givens is also one of three players to have scored more than one hat-trick for Ireland, the others being John Aldridge (2) and Robbie Keane (3).

The Republic of Ireland have conceded eight hat-tricks during their history, the first being scored by Karl-Erik Palmér in a 1950 FIFA World Cup qualification match on 13 November 1949 against Sweden. No player has ever scored more than three goals against Ireland in a single match. Christian Eriksen of Denmark is the most recent player to score a hat-trick against the Republic of Ireland, in a 2018 FIFA World Cup qualification match.

Hat-tricks for the Republic of Ireland

Key

Table
Wartime internationals, not regarded as official matches, are not included in the list.
The result is presented with Republic of Ireland's score first.

Hat-tricks conceded by the Republic of Ireland
Wartime internationals, not regarded as official matches, are not included in the list.
The result is presented with Republic of Ireland's score first.

Notes

References

hat-tricks
National association football team hat-tricks
Association football player non-biographical articles